The 1989 Cincinnati Bengals season was their 20th in the National Football League (NFL) and 22nd overall. The Bengals' 404 points scored were the fourth-most in the NFL in 1989. Four of their eight losses on the season were by a touchdown or less.

The 1989 Bengals are the last NFL team to score 55 points or more twice in a single season: Week 8 against the Tampa Bay Buccaneers (56) and Week 15 against the arch-rival Houston Oilers (61), both at home.

Offseason

NFL Draft

Personnel

Staff

Roster

Regular season

Schedule

Game summaries

Week 1 at Bears

Week 14 vs. Seahawks

Standings

Team leaders

Passing

Rushing

Receiving

Defensive

Kicking and punting

Special teams

Awards and records

Pro Bowl selections 
 Boomer Esiason QB, AFC Pro-Bowl Selection
 Rodney Holman TE, AFC Pro-Bowl Selection
 James Brooks RB, AFC Pro-Bowl Selection
 David Fulcher SS, AFC Pro-Bowl Selection
 Anthony Muñoz LT, AFC Pro-Bowl Selection

Milestones 
 Boomer Esiason, 5th straight 3,000-yard season
 James Brooks, 2nd 1,000-yard season (1,239 yards)
 Tim McGee, 1st 1,000-yard season (1,211 yards)

References

External links 
 1989 Cincinnati Bengals at Pro-Football-Reference.com

Cincinnati Bengals
Cincinnati Bengals seasons
Cinc